The 2018 ANZ Premiership season was the second season of Netball New Zealand's ANZ Premiership.
With a team coached by Reinga Bloxham, captained by Wendy Frew and featuring Gina Crampton, Shannon Francois, Te Paea Selby-Rickit and Te Huinga Reo Selby-Rickit, Southern Steel retained the title, winning their second consecutive premiership. Central Pulse finished the regular season as minor premiers. However, in the grand final Steel defeated Pulse 54–53. The top three teams from the season – Steel, Pulse and Mainland Tactix qualified for the 2018 Netball New Zealand Super Club.

Transfers

Notes
 Malysha Kelly was injured during pre-season.

Head coaches and captains

Pre-season
The official pre-season tournament was held at Te Wānanga o Raukawa in Otaki from 20–22 April, with all six teams competing.

Day 1

 
 
Day 2

 
  
  
Day 3

Regular season

Round 1
The regular season started later than usual on 6 May, delayed because of  the 2018 Commonwealth Games. It began with a Super Sunday event hosted at Fly Palmy Arena. There were wins for Southern Steel, Central Pulse and Mainland Tactix.

Round 2

Round 3

Round 4

Round 5

Round 6
The second Super Sunday event was hosted at Horncastle Arena. There were wins for Southern Steel, Waikato Bay of Plenty Magic and Northern Mystics.

Round 7

Round 8

Round 9

Round 10

Round 11

Round 12
The third Super Sunday was hosted at the Vodafone Events Centre. There were wins for Mainland Tactix, Northern Mystics and Southern Steel.

Round 13

Final ladder

Finals Series

Elimination final

Grand final

Award winners

New Zealand Netball Awards

Team of the season
Brendon Egan selected the Stuff Seven team of the season.

Season statistics

References

   
2018
2018 in New Zealand netball